The Trail of the Cedars is a hiking trail accessible from Going-to-the-Sun Road in Glacier National Park, Montana. The  path is paved and has a raised boardwalk in some sections. The trail splits into two sections: one loops, while the other continues to Avalanche Lake which can reached after a  hike with a  elevation gain. In the middle of the half loop is a beautiful waterfall that has carved through colorful rock to make a channeled stream.

References

Going-to-the-Sun Road
Protected areas of Flathead County, Montana
Hiking trails in Montana
Glacier National Park (U.S.)
Flora of Montana